The French Ambassador to Turkey is the successor post to the French Ambassador to the Ottoman Empire.

List
Ambassadors of the Third, Fourth and Fifth Republic to the Republic of Turkey. Embassy transferred to Ankara.

Albert Sarraut 1925–1926
Nosky Daeschner 1926–1928
Charles Pineton de Chambrun 1928–1933
Albert Kammerer  1933–1936
Henri Ponsot 1936–1938
René Massigli 1938–1940
Gaston Maugras 1944–1948
Jean Lescuyer 1948–1952
Jacques Tarbé de Saint-Hardouin 1952–1955
Jean-Paul Garnier 1955–1957
Henry Spitzmüller 1957–1963
Bernard Hardion 1963–1965
Gontran Begoügne de Juniac 1965–1970
Arnaud Wapler 1970–1973
Roger Vaurs  1973–1977
Emile Cazimajou 1977–1981
Fernand Rouillon 1981–1985
Philippe Louët 1985–1988
Eric Rouleau 1988–1991
François Dopffer 1991–1996
Daniel Lequertier 1996–1999
Jean-Claude Cousseran 2000–2004
Paul Poudade 2004–2007
Bernard Émié 2007–2011
Laurent Bili 2011–2015
Charles Fries 2015–2020
Hervé Magro 2020–

External links
  French embassy in Turkey
 French Ministry of Foreign Affairs

Turkey
France